Tim Backshall may refer to:

Tim Backshall (television presenter), English television presenter with ITV
Tim Backshall (credit analyst), co-editor of the financial website Zero Hedge